The Man Who Cheated Himself is a 1950 American crime film noir directed by Felix E. Feist and starring Lee J. Cobb, Jane Wyatt and John Dall.

Plot
Wealthy socialite Lois Frazer, divorcing her fortune-hunter husband, Howard, finds a gun he had bought. She kills him with it in front of the new man in her life, Lt. Ed Cullen, a homicide detective with the San Francisco police. Cullen takes control, discarding the weapon and moving the body. Cullen ends up assigned to investigate the case, assisted by kid brother Andy, who is new to the homicide division and delays the honeymoon to keep working on his first big case.

The gun is found and used in another killing by a young punk, Nito Capa, and Cullen—with few options to save himself and his paramour Lois—tries to pin both crimes on him. However, Andy keeps connecting Ed to the first murder, catching him in a number of evasions and lies. In desperation, Ed knocks Andy out, ties and gags him, and calls Lois and tells her they need to flee. Police roadblocks seal off the city, but Andy has a hunch where Ed took Lois to hide, at the abandoned ruins of Fort Point under the Golden Gate Bridge where Andy and his brother played together when they were children. Their escape plan almost works, but they are ultimately arrested. Outside the courtroom, Ed sees Lois affectionately offering to do anything for her lawyer if he can keep her from being convicted. Defeated, Ed offers her a cigarette and they share a final goodbye gaze.

Cast
 Lee J. Cobb as Lt. Ed Cullen
 Jane Wyatt as Lois Frazer
 John Dall as Andy Cullen
 Lisa Howard as Janet Cullen
 Harlan Warde as Howard Frazer
 Tito Vuolo as Pietro Capa
 Charles Arnt as Ernest Quimby (as Charles E. Arnt)
 Marjorie Bennett as Muriel Quimby
 Alan Wells as Nito Capa

Production
The film was initially known as The Gun. It was the first independent production from Jack M. Warner and started filming on location in San Francisco on 15 May 1950. It was to be distributed by United Artists. It was Cobb's first film since his Broadway success in Death of a Salesman.

By June, the film was released by Fox. In August 1950, it was retitled The Man Who Cheated Himself.

The film was shot at General Service Studio.

Reception

Critical response
Film critic Dennis Schwartz gave the film a positive review, writing in 2005, "In an engaging film noir efficiently directed by Felix E. Feist ... The Man Who Cheated Himself is the perfect film for the beginning of the bland Eisenhower years."

According to Fabio Vighi (2012), "[A great example of the coincidence of law and crime is in the] B-noir The Man Who Cheated Himself, particularly in the scenes with the two brothers: on the one hand, the law as neutral, non-pathological instrument (the 'good cop' played by the younger brother); on the other hand, the law as crime (the older cop, played by Lee J. Cobb). The latter is not the generically corrupt cop but a detective who is driven, like few other noir detectives, by the femme fatale he is besotted by ... 'You said it, she's got under my skin' are his final words to his brother." (159)

See also
 List of films in the public domain in the United States

References

External links
 
 
 
 
 
 The Man Who Cheated Himself informational site and DVD review at DVD Beaver (includes images)
 

1950 films
1950 crime drama films
20th Century Fox films
American crime drama films
American black-and-white films
Film noir
Films directed by Felix E. Feist
Films set in San Francisco
1950s English-language films
1950s American films